The Yozgat Pine Grove National Park is a national park consisting of pine trees in Yozgat, Central Anatolia Region of Turkey. It was established on February 5, 1958 as the country's first national park.

Yozgat Pine Grove National Park is administered by the Directorate-General of Forestry, a governmental agency of the Ministry of Forestry and Water Affairs. The species of pine trees within the national park are found only in the higher elevations of Caucasus Mountains. According to Ali Şimşek, the director of the park, the trees, between 350 and 500 years old, are under protection. Some of the trees are tagged with their age on them.

It is a popular recreational area for the residents of the city. The park has various facilities for visitors like a three-star hotel, campsite, restaurant, cafeteria and playground.

References

Protected areas established in 1958
National parks of Turkey
Tourist attractions in Yozgat Province
Geography of Yozgat Province